L'École du Pacifique is a French first language elementary school located in Sechelt, British Columbia, Canada. It serves the Francophone population of the Sunshine Coast, British Columbia. It includes a French Program at Chatelech Secondary School. Since September 2010, there are 15 staff and 145 students in the Francophone Program from Kindergarten to Grade 12.

External links
http://pacifique.csf.bc.ca/

Elementary schools in British Columbia
French-language schools in British Columbia
Sechelt
Educational institutions established in 1989
1989 establishments in British Columbia